Marigold Linton (born 1936) is a cognitive psychologist and member of the Morongo Band of Cahuilla Mission Indians. In 1964, she became the first Native American to earn a doctorate in psychology. In 1974, she co–founded the National Indian Education Association. Her research in long-term memory is widely cited in psychology. She is director for mathematics and science initiatives in the University of Texas system, where she is responsible for bringing minority students into those two fields. She has been president of the Society for Advancement of Chicanos and Native Americans in Science.

Biography
A great-great-granddaughter of Antonio Garra, war chief of the Cupeno who organized an 1847 Indian insurrection against Agoston Haraszthy, San Diego County's first sheriff, Marigold Linton was 
born on the Morongo Reservation in Southern California. Her grandfather was Sadakichi Hartmann. Raised in poverty, she overcame hardship and adversity to become in 1954 the first Indian from a California reservation to attend college. Attending the newly opened University of California, Riverside, she earned straight As to obtain her B.A. in Psychology and completed two publications by the time she entered graduate school at the University of Iowa, eventually obtaining her Ph.D. from UCLA. She received her PhD in 1964, and this made her the first Native American to earn a doctorate in psychology.

University of Kansas and Haskell Indian Nations University 
To support biomedical research for American Indian students and faculty she collaborated and help develop funding for the Bridges to the Baccalaureate programs, Initiative for Maximizing Student Development (IMSD), Research Initiative for Scientific Enhancement (RISE), Post Baccalaureate Research Education Program (PREP), and the Institutional Research and Academic Career Development Award (IRACDA).

Helped raise more than $18 million in grants for the Kansas-Haskell partnership.

Society for Advancement of Chicanos and Native Americans in Science (SACNAS) 
One of the founding member of SACNAS (Society for Advancement of Chicanos and Native Americans in Science). SACNAS advocates opportunities in science education for Chicano/Latino, Native American, and other underrepresented minority students to excel in science based careers. SACNAS is composed of students, K-12 educators, administrators, industry scientists, and science professors. From 2004 until 2007 Linton was the President of SACNAS Board of Directors.

National Indian Education Association (NIEA) 
She collaborated with others in founding the National Indian Education Association. The NIEA was established in 1969. The NIEA is a non-profit advocacy organization that helps ensure that American Indian, Alaskan Native, and Native Hawaiian educators, tribal leaders, school administrators, teachers, parents, and students, have a voice in education. The NIEA today has more than 10,000 members.

Significant National Appointments 
She has had a number of significant national appointments including: Committee on Equality of Opportunity in Science and Engineering (CEOSE), congressionally mandated NSF Committee (2006-2009); NIH National Institutes of General Medical Science, National Advisory Research Resources Council (1982-1986); Carnegie Foundation for the Advancement of Teaching, Board of Directors (1977-1985); National Research Council, Committee on Assessment for NIH Minority Research/Training Programs, III (2001-2004); and the National Academy of Sciences, Fellowship Office Advisory Committee (2009-2011).

Published works
Linton, M. (1982) 'Transformations of memory in everyday life', in Neisser, U. (ed.) Memory Observed: Remembering in Natural Contexts, San Francisco, Freeman.

Linton, M. (1986) 'Ways of searching and the contents of memory', in Rubin, D.C. (ed.) Autobiographical Memory, Cambridge, Cambridge University Press.

References

External links
Biography at the SACNAS Biography Project
Marigold Linton Scholarship and brief biography

American women psychologists
University of California, Riverside alumni
Cupeno
Cahuilla people
Serrano people
1936 births
Living people
20th-century Native Americans
21st-century Native Americans
20th-century Native American women
21st-century Native American women
Native American women scientists
Scientists from California
Native American people from California
21st-century American psychologists
20th-century American psychologists